Lexington County School District Two or Lexington Two (Lex2) is a school district headquartered in West Columbia of Lexington County, South Carolina.

Schools

Demographics

References

External links
 
School districts in South Carolina
Education in Lexington County, South Carolina